Marjan Nazghlich, born in 1974, was an Iranian Governor who died in the 2015 Mina stampede. She obtained two bachelor degrees in educational sciences and judicial rights, and became the third female Governor of Iran and the first for Golestan Province.

Death 

On the morning of September 24, 2023, which coincided with Eid Al-Adha, Nazghlich was caught in a crush of pilgrims along one of the main routes from Mina to Jamarat that resulted in thousands of injuries and deaths. During the stampede, Nazghlich attempted to help the injured pilgrims but she fell and was trampled. She was taken to a hospital, where she died.

References 

1974 births
2015 deaths
People from Golestan Province
21st-century Iranian women politicians
21st-century Iranian politicians
Iranian governors
Accidental deaths in Iran